Than Paing (born 6 December 1996) is Burmese professional footballer who plays as a striker for    Kanchanaburi City in Thai League 3 Western region and Myanmar national football team. He scored the only goal in the 2014 AFC U-19 Championship quarter-final that sent Myanmar to the 2015 FIFA U-20 World Cup for the first time in their history.

Career

Yangon United
Than Paing scored first ever goal for Yangon United Senior team 2015 MNL second leg against Zwekapin United draw 2-2.

Chin United
In second half season of 2017 MNL, Cezar transferred to Yangon United F.C. . So, Than Paing moved to Chin United F.C. for 6 months loan.

Club

International

International goals
Scores and results list Myanmar's goal tally first.

Honours

Hassanal Bolkiah Trophy: 2014

References

1996 births
Living people
People from Hsipaw
Burmese footballers
Myanmar international footballers
Association football forwards
Yangon United F.C. players
Competitors at the 2017 Southeast Asian Games
Southeast Asian Games competitors for Myanmar